The Zero Boys is an American slasher film, written and directed by Nico Mastorakis and starring Daniel Hirsch, Kelli Maroney, Nicole Rio, and Tom Shell.

Plot
Steve (Daniel Hirsch), Larry (Tom Shell), and Rip (Jared Moses) are part of a paintball team known as "The Zero Boys".  After winning a paintball tournament, they decide to celebrate.  When the trio and their girlfriends take a leisure trip into the mountains, they stumble upon the most gruesome massacre in history.  Blood-chilling screams lead the group to a deserted cabin, where they gradually discover the horrors of the killings and the evil causing it.  Now the Zero Boys, armed with real weapons of their own, must do what comes best - destroy the enemy.

Cast 

 Daniel Hirsch as Steve Kerski 
 Kelli Maroney as Jamie
 Nicole Rio as Sue
 Tom Shell as Larry
 Jared Moses as Rip
 Crystal Carson as Trish
 Joe Estevez as Killer
 Gary Jochimsen as Killer #2
 John Michaels as Casey
 Elise Turner as Victim
 T.K. Webb as Killer #3
 Jason Ricketts as Soldier #1
 Stephen Kay as Soldier #2
 Neil Weiss as Soldier #3
 Harry Donenfeld as Snake Man
 Dennis Ott as Soldier #4
 Patrick Hirsch as Soldier #5
 Trudy Adams as Secretary 
 Angelia High as Spectator #1
 Jessica Tress as Spectator #2
 Christina Cardan as Spectator #3
 Steven Shaw as Coach
 Marc Meisels as Soldier #5

Home media
The film was released on DVD by Simitar Video in 2000.  It was subsequently re-released by Image Entertainment in 2003 and by Arrow Films on Blu-ray/DVD on April 26, 2016.

References

External links

1986 horror films
1986 films
1980s slasher films
American slasher films
1980s English-language films
Films scored by Stanley Myers
Films scored by Hans Zimmer
Films directed by Nico Mastorakis
1980s American films